Ruagea microphylla is a species of plant in the family Meliaceae. It is endemic to Ecuador. It has been listed as an endangered species by the International Union for Conservation of Nature (IUCN)

References

Flora of Ecuador
microphylla
Endangered plants
Taxonomy articles created by Polbot